The 1970 IIHF European U19 Championship was the third playing of the IIHF European Junior Championships.

Group A 
Played in Geneva, Switzerland from December 26, 1969, to January 2, 1970.

Switzerland was relegated for 1971.

Tournament Awards
Top Scorer: Yuri Savtsillo  (10 Points)
Top Goalie: Anton Kehle
Top Defenceman:Miroslav Dvorak
Top Forward: Anders Hedberg

Group B 
Played in Kapfenberg, Leoben, and Bruck, Austria, from December 26, 1969, to January 2, 1970.

First round 
Group 1

Group 2
Bulgaria was to play in this group but forfeited.  The Yugoslavian goaltender played without a mask, and was hit in the face by a shot in their game against Poland, in part explaining the 20 to 0 score.

Placing round 

Norway was promoted to Group A for 1971.

References

Complete results
 

Junior
IIHF European Junior Championship tournament
International ice hockey competitions hosted by Switzerland
International ice hockey competitions hosted by Austria
U19
U19
December 1969 sports events in Europe
January 1970 sports events in Europe
Sports competitions in Geneva
20th century in Geneva
Leoben
Bruck an der Mur